Dr. Ricardo Adolfo Galli Granada, also known as gallir, is a doctor of computer science at the University of the Balearic Islands, where he teaches operating system design. He is a speaker for the Free Software Foundation and a free software activist.

Projects 
As a university project, he created a system that allows controlling of the airship parking at the Son Sant Joan Airport in Palma de Mallorca, Balearic Islands, Spain.

In December 2005, he programmed Menéame, a clone of the well-known Digg Web site, which serves to promote stories published on blogs. He then released the source code of Meneame, which the source code of the open source Digg clone Pligg CMS is based on.

He programmed cpudyn, a daemon that can be used to underclock portable computers to reduce their power consumption.

He programmed wp-cache, a WordPress plugin for the purpose of caching pages to make one's blog "faster and more responsive".

In 2001, he was nominated for a Hispalinux prize. He has published over 200 technical articles in BULMA, a local Linux user Web site.

References

External links

Ricardo Galli, de software libre — Galli's old blog 
menéame.net — Collaborative news site, launched by Galli

GNU people
Free software programmers
Computer systems researchers
People from Mallorca
Living people
Academic staff of the University of the Balearic Islands
Year of birth missing (living people)
WordPress